Mukar Shaltakovich Cholponbayev (29 March 1950 – 24 May 2020) was a Kyrgyzstani politician.

Life
Cholponbayev was born on 29 March 1950 in Issyk-Kul Region, Kyrgyz SSR. He graduated from Kyrgyz National University in 1976. From 1984 to 1991, he served as Deputy Head of the Legal Department of the Supreme Council of the Kyrgyz SSR, and later was promoted to Head of the Legal Department.

After the collapse of the Soviet Union, from 1991 to 1993, he served as the Head of Department of Justice of Chuy Region, and Head of the Presidential Administration Department. Later, he served as Minister of Justice (1993–95), and the Chairman of the Legislative Assembly of Kyrgyzstan (1995–96). 

He died in Bishkek on 24 May 2020, after contracting COVID-19 during the COVID-19 pandemic in Kyrgyzstan.

References

1950 births
2020 deaths
Chairmen of the Legislative Assembly of Kyrgyzstan
Justice ministers of Kyrgyzstan
People from Issyk-Kul Region
Kyrgyz National University alumni
Deaths from the COVID-19 pandemic in Kyrgyzstan